Hollenberg is a hamlet in the Dutch province of Gelderland. It is located in the municipality of Aalten, between Aalten and Bredevoort.

Hollenberg was an execution site in the 18th century. The postal authorities have placed it under Aalten.

References

Populated places in Gelderland
Aalten